Phyllodactylus saxatilis is a medium-sized gecko. It is found in Mexico.

References

saxatilis
Reptiles of Mexico
Reptiles described in 1964
Taxa named by James R. Dixon